The Abbey of Santi Vito e Salvo (Italian: Abbazia dei Santi Vito e Salvo) was a Cistercian monastery located in San Salvo, Province of Chieti, Italy.

History
It was founded in 1247 by the mother abbey Santa Maria della Ferraria in Campania, of the line of Abbey of Clairvaux.

At the beginnings, the location selected for the abbey was in a swampy area close to San Salvo, but the harsh living conditions pushed the monks to move inside the town.

The abbey developed in the area nowadays known as "il quadrilatero", but it was abandoned in 1453 after an attack launched by the Turks.

Architecture
The structures of the abbey are completely lost, with new buildings constructed around the squared area of the original closter.

The new church of San Giuseppe was built in place of the previous one: the only remains of the original building are two lancet windows on the side of the church. The original well of the abbey was discovered during recent excavations.

See also
 List of Cistercian monasteries

References

Bibliography

External links

Vito e Salvo
Buildings and structures in the Province of Chieti